Petra Kudláčková (born 17 October 1994) is a Czech handballer for DHC Slavia Prague and the Czech national team.

She participated at the 2018 European Women's Handball Championship.

References

External links

1994 births
Living people
Sportspeople from Prague
Czech female handball players
Expatriate handball players
Czech expatriate sportspeople in Sweden
21st-century Czech women